The Enrique Iglesias and Ricky Martin Live in Concert was a co-headlining concert tour by Spanish singer Enrique Iglesias and Puerto Rican artist Ricky Martin. The tour began in Las Vegas, Nevada on September 25, 2021 and concluded in Anaheim on November 20, 2021. The tour grossed $19,265,066 with a total attendance of 177,642 from 15 shows reported in 2021. According to Touring Data the tour was ranked #22 of the 2021 Year-End Worldwide ($34.80 million revenue from 306,917 tickets sold in 26 shows performed).

Background
The two Latin music superstars announced on March 4, 2020 that they're embarking on a joint tour. Enrique Iglesias and Ricky Martin shared the news with a group of reporters at a press conference in Los Angeles. The two will also be joined by Sebastián Yatra.

"We're both putting out new music too," Iglesias said during the event, adding in Spanish, "This is a historic moment and we've been wanting to do this for a long time... The show will be spectacular."

Martin added, "There's nothing like standing on stage and feeling the power of thousands of people and getting up and to dance."  The two also mentioned the possibility of recording a song together, explaining that they have been talking about collaborating for a long time.

Following the announcement, Yatra exclusively told ET, "It’s a huge dream come true and one that I never imagined was possible with two of my biggest idols, the people who have influenced me so much over the years. We're going to enjoy this tour and I'm grateful to Ricky and Enrique. I'm ready to learn from them, see more of the United States and enjoy this special moment."

Setlist 
The following setlist is taken from the singers' performances at MGM Grand Garden Arena on September 25. It is not meant to represent all shows.

{{hidden
| headercss = background-color:#964B00; color:white; font-size:100%; width:100%;
| contentcss = text-align:left; font-size:100%; width:100%;
| header = Ricky Martin
| content =
"Livin' la Vida Loca"
"La Bomba"
"Qué Rico Fuera"
"Vuelve"
"Lola, Lola"
"She Bangs"
"Shake Your Bon-Bon"
"Nobody Wants to Be Lonely"
"Pégate"
"La Mordidita"
"María"
"Vente Pa' Ca"
Encore
"The Cup of Life"
}}

{{hidden
| headercss = background-color:#964B00; color:white; font-size:100%; width:100%;
| contentcss = text-align:left; font-size:100%; width:100%;
| header = Enrique Iglesias
| content =
"I'm a Freak"
"Chasing the Sun"
"I Like How It Feels"
"Duele el Corazón"
"Bailamos"
"Cuando Me Enamoro"
"Loco"
"Me Pasé"
"Súbeme la Radio"
"Be With You"
"Escape"
"Tonight (I'm Lovin' You)"
Encore
"Hero"
"El Perdón"
"Bailando"
"I Like It"
}}

Shows

References

External links
Ricky Martin official website
Enrique Iglesias official website

Ricky Martin concert tours
Enrique Iglesias concert tours
Co-headlining concert tours
2021 concert tours
Concert tours postponed due to the COVID-19 pandemic